The Tyne and Wear North-West Cluster is the consortium of schools in North-Tyneside that work together to improve the educational opportunities for their students. The schools in the cluster are Longbenton Community College, George Stephenson High School and Seaton Burn College.

The schools collectively maintain an area of the North Tyneside Learning Portal, and some subjects and projects are not concentrated on by the schools alone, but the schools collectively. Each of the schools has its own role in the cluster.

The High schools work closely with their 'feeder' Primary schools to help develop a smooth transition for new Year 7 students. The schools share resources (including staff expertise) and have a successful 6th Form.

Schools in the Metropolitan Borough of North Tyneside